The Supervising Scientist is a statutory office under Australian law, originally created to assist in the monitoring of what was then one of the world's largest uranium mines, the Ranger Uranium Mine. It now provides advice more generally on a 'wide range of scientific matters and mining-related environmental issues of national importance, including; radiological matters and tropical wetlands conservation and management'. The Supervising Scientist is administered as a division within the Department of the Environment, Water, Heritage and the Arts.

See also
Uranium mining in Australia
Uranium mining in Kakadu National Park

References

External links
Environment Protection (Alligator Rivers Region) Act 1978
Supervising Scientist annual reports

Commonwealth Government agencies of Australia
Environment of Australia
Radioactive waste
Uranium mining in Australia